Ice hockey has been a key element of Canada's cultural and social history. This has been captured on various releases from Canada Post.  In 1956 Canada Post Office released a 5¢ stamp paying tribute to Canadian hockey players for "the prestige they have earned for Canada in international competition." Releases of the late 20th century included the commemoration of the XV Olympic Winter Games held in Calgary, a three-stamp set honouring the 75th anniversary of the National Hockey League, the 100th anniversary of the Stanley Cup, and the 25th anniversary of the 1972 Summit Series. In the 2000s, the key release has been the series of National Hockey League All-Stars. The series lasted from 2000 to 2005. Other hockey issues have included a commemorative envelope to commemorate the 25th anniversary of the International Postal Hockey Tournament and a stamp to commemorate the 2002 Winter Olympics in Salt Lake City, Utah featured a hockey player.

National Hockey League All-Star Stamps
The world of sports is not without its celebrations in the 2000 millennium year, and perhaps first among them was the 50th National Hockey League (NHL) All-Star Game. Held on February 6, 2000 in Toronto, host city of the first official all-star game in 1947, the match was the centrepiece of the all-star weekend at the Air Canada Centre. In honour of this historic Canadian event, Canada Post is proud to present a commemorative six-stamp issue featuring some of this country's greatest hockey stars.

Available as a 6-stamp souvenir sheet with a souvenir folder, the same 6-stamp souvenir sheet without a folder, and on an OFDC three-pack, this domestic-rate release pays tribute to a tradition that reaches back to hockey's early days. The souvenir sheet features an All-Star lineup of Canadian hockey greats including Wayne Gretzky "The Great One", Gordie Howe "Mr. Hockey", Maurice "Rocket" Richard, Doug Harvey, Bobby Orr and Jacques Plante.

Early all-star matches were staged to raise funds in support of the families of ailing or deceased players. The first such game took place on January 2, 1908, when the Hod Stuart Memorial Match was held for the family of the late Montreal Wanderers defenseman who had died in a diving accident. The NHL tradition of selecting first- and second-team all-stars began in 1930-31 season. Three years later, the Toronto Maple Leafs defeated an NHL all-star team 7-3 in a match to benefit Toronto forward Ace Bailey and his family. Bailey's career had ended a few months before when he fractured his skull during a game in Boston. The 50th game falls in 2000 though the tradition of an annual all-star game began 53 years ago. Two matches were pre-empted by speciality series - the 1979 Challenge Cup and Rendez-Vous '87.

Combining canvas illustration and computer design, artists Dan Fell and Vincent McIndoe joined forces for the 50th NHL All-Star Game issue. Action vignettes featuring the players appear to emerge from the spotlighted ice surface, drawing attention to the famous careers brought together for this special all-star game. The all-star logo is flanked by vignettes of the silhouettes of Maple Leaf Gardens and the Air Canada Centre - sites of the first and 50th HNL All-Star Game. Each star in the row of five along the bottom of the souvenir sheet symbolizes ten years of All-Star match-ups.

2000

2001

2002

2003

2004

2005

NHL 75th Anniversary Stamps
A Prestige Booklet containing three stamp designs of different sporting eras will be issued on October 9, 1992 to mark the 75th anniversary of the National Hockey League. With informative text and illustrations, the 25-stamp booklet covers three outstanding eras of the league's history: first the early years (1917–1942); the six-team years (1942–1967); and the expansion years (1968–1992).

The first stamp shows hockey-related artifacts like an early puck, a stick and a pair of goalie skates. The player is Babe Siebert from the Montreal Maroons. The next stamp displays the crests of the six teams competing between 1942 and 1967. The vignette portrays Claude Provost and Terry Sawchuck. The third illustrates Jacque Plante's famous goalie mask, his last.

The original NHL was founded in November 1917 as a means to disband the old National Hockey Association and discredit Toronto owner Eddie Livingstone. Initially the league boasted five teams, including the defunct and recently resurrected Ottawa Senators. By 1926 it had expanded south, with both a Canadian and an American division. As the game and the league continued to evolve, many changes were made, including the mandatory sweater number in 1930, the goal green light in 1938 and the red line in 1943.

Stamp Details

The Series of the Century, 1972
With 34 seconds left in Game 8 of the 1972 Summit Series between Canada and Russia, Paul Henderson scored the goal that gave Canada the 6-5 lead. The detail of the goal includes Phil Esposito intercepting the puck and firing a shot toward the net. By this time Henderson had picked himself up off the ice, picked up Esposito's rebound [and] fired the puck at Tretiak. The Soviet goalkeeper got a toe on the shot but lost his balance as he made the save. Henderson pounced on the rebound and dribbled the puck under a prone Tretiak just as Liapkin reached him.

To celebrate the 25th anniversary of the 1972 Canada-Soviet hockey series and the momentous day in the history of Canada's favourite pastime, Canada Post released "The Series of the Century" commemorative stamp issue. Designed by Charles Vinh of Montreal, the set of two domestic-rate stamps depicts Team Canada's thrilling victory exquisite illustrations, adaptations of photographs taken by Montreal's Denis Brodeur. The first stamp, features the immediate aftermath of the all-important goal. Sports hero Paul Henderson raises his arms in jubilation against the backdrop of the Russian team net. The second stamp captures the team in a congratulatory huddle after the game.

Canada Post also released a pane of 10 stamps with both designs. On top of this, Canada Post issued a pane of 10 stamps with an overprint of two hockey sticks, a puck, and Paul Henderson's signature. The overprinted panes were only available as part of a Canada Post special collector's gift box that contained a Paul Henderson signed hockey puck, poster, sweatshirt with "The Goal" on the front, and the overprinted pane of 10 stamps. The number of gift sets issued is not known, but the issue price for the gift box was $39.95 at Post Offices. The overprinted pane is now valued in the Unitrade Canadian Stamp Catalogue at $100.00, while the boxed set is valued at $125.00. The normal pane of the ten stamps is valued at just over $10.00 Canadian.

Stamp Details

Olympic Stamps

Other

Commemorative Envelopes

References

Ice hockey in Canada
Postage stamps of Canada